Amtali Paurasava is a Paurasava in Amtali Upazila in Barguna District in the Barisal Division of southern-central Bangladesh. It's famous for Amtali M.U High School and Amtali Degree College.It Stands on the bank of Payra River. It is the main Upazila of Barguna District

References

Maru Hasan Hira,
Mushfiqur Rahman Remans

Populated places in Barisal District